The Orbales are an order of Pseudomonadota with the single family Orbaceae. This order was created to accommodate novel bacterial species isolated from the guts of honeybees and bumblebees.

References

Gammaproteobacteria